Naomi or Noemi is a given name in various languages and cultures.

Hebrew
Naomi (nah-o-mi) is a feminine name of Hebrew origin. In Hebrew, it means "pleasantness" and was originally pronounced with the stress on the i (the o is a hataf qamatz, marked with a shva to indicate that it is very short). In the Book of Ruth, Naomi is Ruth's mother-in-law, making the name Naomi a Biblical name.

Japanese
, pronounced  is a Japanese name. Though it is a unisex name, it is primarily used by women. Naomi can be spelled using hiragana, katakana, kanji, or a combination of kana and kanji.
For example;

Popularity
Naomi was among the five most popular names for Black newborn girls in the American state of Virginia in 2022.

People named Naomi or Noemi

Academia
Naomi Chazan (born 1946), Israeli academic and politician
Naomi Jochnowitz, American mathematician
Naomi Oreskes (born 1958), American science historian

Fine arts
Marie-Noémi Cadiot, French sculptor of the 19th century

Authors
Naomi Alderman (born 1974), English novelist and game writer
Naomi Frankel, German-Israeli novelist
Naomi Jacob, English author, actress and broadcaster
Naomi Klein, Canadian journalist, author, and social activist
Naomi Lindstrom, Latin Americanist literary critic
Naomi Mitchison, Scottish novelist and poet
Naomi Novik, American novelist
Naomi Replansky (1918–2023), American poet
Naomi Royde-Smith, British novelist
Naomi Schor, American literary critic and theorist
Naomi Wolf, American feminist author
Noémi Kiss, Hungarian writer
Denise Naomi Klein, British romantic novelist
Naomi Shihab Nye, American poet and author.

Film
, Japanese actress and singer
Naomi Battrick, British actress
Naomi Bentley, British actress
Naomi Childers, silent film actress
Naomie Harris, English actress
Naomi Grossman (born 1975), American actress
Naomi Foner Gyllenhaal, American screenwriter
Naomi Kawase, Japanese film director
Noémie Lvovsky, French film director
Naomi Nagasawa (Nao Nagasawa), Japanese voice actress
Naomi Nishida, Japanese actress
Naomi Scott, English actress, singer and musician
Naomi Sequeira, Australian actress and singer
Naomi Shindō, Japanese voice actress
Noemi Steuer, Swiss actress
Naomi Stevens, character actress of film and television
Noomi Rapace, Swedish actress
Naomi Wakabayashi, Japanese voice actress
, Japanese actress
Naomi Watts, British actress

Law
Noemí Rial, Argentinian lawyer and politician
Noemí Sanín, Colombian lawyer and politician

Modelling
Naomi Campbell (born 1970), British supermodel
Naomi Sims, African American model, businesswoman and author
Noémie Lenoir, French model
Noemi Letizia, Italian celebrity

Music
Noemi (singer), Italian singer (born Veronica Scopelliti) and music video director
Naomi Allen, singer signed to Def Jam
Noemí Carrión, Spanish singer and actress
Naomi Chiaki (born 1947), Japanese singer and actress
Noémi Győri (born 1963), Hungarian classical flautist
Naomi Hall, American musician
Naomi Higginson, British singer best known as Caleidra
Naomi Judd, American country music singer, songwriter, and activist
Noëmi Nadelmann (born 1962), Swiss soprano
Naomi Neville, pseudonym of American composer Allen Toussaint (1938–2015)
Naomi Phoenix, English singer-songwriter
Naomi Polani (born 1927), Israeli musical director, theater director, singer, producer, actress, and dancer
Noémi Rime, French soprano
Naomi Shemer, Israeli songwriter, the "first lady of Israeli song and poetry" 
Naomi Yang, singer with the group Galaxie 500
 (born 1994), member of the Indonesian idol group JKT48

Politics
Naomi Biden, American lawyer and granddaughter of U.S. President Joe Biden
Naomi Gonzalez, Democratic member of the Texas House of Representatives
Naomi Jakobsson, Democratic member of the Illinois House of Representatives
Naomi Long, Leader of the Alliance Party of Northern Ireland
Naomi C. Matusow (born 1938), New York politician
Naomi Mata'afa, Prime Minister of Samoa
Noemí Rial, Argentine Secretary of Labor
Noemí Santana Perera, a member of the Podemos party of Spain
Naomi Tokashiki, Japanese politician
Naomi Wyatt, Secretary of the Pennsylvania Office of Administration
Naomi Yamamoto, Canadian politician
Ruth Noemí Colón, Secretary of State of New York

Sport
Naomi Broady (born 1990), British tennis player
Naomi Castle, Australian water polo player
Naomi Folkard (born 1983), English archer
, Japanese cross-country skier
Naomi Isozaki, Japanese Paralympic archer
Naomi James, round-the-world sailor
Naomi Lang, American ice dancer
, Japanese softball player
Naomi Mugo, Kenyan middle distance runner
Naomi Osaka, Haitian-Japanese professional tennis player
Naomi Russell, Australian gymnast
, Japanese bobsledder
Naomi Uemura, Japanese adventurer, first person to reach the North Pole solo
Naomi van As, Dutch field hockey player
Naomi Young (born 1976), Australian synchronized swimmer
Noémi Boekel, Dutch softball player
Noemi Cantele, Italian road bicycle racer
Noémi Dakos, Hungarian handballer
, Japanese sport wrestler
Naomi Knight, ring name for American professional wrestler and dancer Trinity McCray
Noemi Lung, former Romanian butterfly and medley swimmer
Noémi Németh, Hungarian hammer thrower
, Japanese swimmer
Noemí Simonetto de Portela, Argentine athlete
Naomi Taniguchi, Japanese racer
Noémi Tóth, Italian water polo defender
Noémi Trufán, Hungarian handballer

Other notable people
Noémi Ban, Hungarian-born American Jew and Holocaust survivor
Noemí de Miguel (born 1980), Spanish sports journalist and television presenter
Naomi Ferguson, commissioner of the New Zealand Inland Revenue Department
Naomi Gray, American, first female Vice President of Planned Parenthood
Naomi Milgrom, Australian business owner
Naomi Miller, American murder victim
Naomi Sewell Richardson, African-American suffragist and educator
Naomi Smalls (born 1993), the stage name of American drag queen Davis Heppenstall
Naomi Wu, also known as SexyCyborg, Chinese DIY maker and internet personality

Fictional characters

 Naomi McDuffie, title character in Naomi (TV series)
Naomi, a cow villager from the video game series Animal Crossing
Naomi, in Kamen Rider
Naomi, in the Tokusatsu series Kamen Rider Den-O
Naomi, in MicroVolts
Naomi, Phantom Society Devil Summoner in the video game Soul Hackers
Naomi, in the US TV Series Supernatural
Naomi Armitage, protagonist of the anime Armitage III
Naomi Bennett, in the Grey's Anatomy spin-off Private Practice
Naomi Campbell, in the television series Skins
Naomi Clark, a socialite in the CW primetime drama show 90210
Naomi Collins, in Dark Shadows
Naomi Dorrit, in the American drama/adventure television series Lost
Naomi Harper, in the American sitcom Mama's Family
Naomi Hunter, in the Metal Gear series
Naomi Inoue, in Code Geass
Naomi Julien, in the soap opera EastEnders
Naomi Katagaki, in the anime film Hello World
Naomi Lapaglia, in movie The Wolf of Wall Street
Naomi Misora, ex-FBI agent in the anime and manga series Death Note
Naomi Nagata, in the book series The Expanse by James S. A. Corey, and its television adaptation
Naomi Nakashima, in the survival horror video game Corpse Party
Naomi Rodriguez, in the musical 21 Chump Street
Naomi Turner, in Elena of Avalor
Naomi Umegae, a government agent with psychokinetic powers in Zettai Karen Children.
Naomi Wildman, in the television series Star Trek: Voyager
Naomi Zeigler, in the book series Pretty Little Liars by Sarah Shepard

See also
Naomi (disambiguation)

References

English feminine given names
English-language feminine given names
Feminine given names
Hebrew-language names
Japanese unisex given names
Lists of people by given name